E3 ubiquitin-protein ligase TRIM33, also known as (ectodermin homolog and tripartite motif-containing 33) is a protein encoded in the human by the gene TRIM33, a member of the tripartite motif family.

TRIM33 is thought to be a transcriptional corepressor. However unlike the related TRIM24 and TRIM28 proteins, few transcription factors such as SMAD4 that interact with TRIM33 have been identified.

Structure 
The protein is a member of the tripartite motif family. This motif includes three zinc-binding domains:
 RING
 B-box type 1 zinc finger
 B-box type 2 zinc finger
and a coiled-coil region.

Three alternatively spliced transcript variants for this gene have been described, however, the full-length nature of one variant has not been determined.

Interactions 
TRIM33 has been shown to interact with TRIM24.

Role in cancer 
TRIM33 acts as a tumor suppressor gene preventing the development chronic myelomonocytic leukemia.
TRIM33 regulates also the TRIM28 receptor and promotes physiological aging of hematopoietic stem cells.

TRIM33 acts as an oncogene by preventing apoptosis in B-cell leukemias.

References

Further reading

External links 
 

Gene expression
Transcription coregulators